Emeric Dudouit (born 7 September 1991) is a French professional footballer who plays as a defensive midfielder for Belgian club Virton.

Dudouit progressed through the youth system at Caen but never made a first-team appearance for the club and transferred to Châteauroux in the summer of 2012. He made his professional debut on 18 January 2013, coming on as a substitute for Yohan Hautcoeur in the 0–2 defeat to Le Mans. Dudouit went on to play 37 matches in all competitions for the club over the next two-and-a-half years before leaving at the end of the 2014–15 season. He signed for Les Herbiers in June 2015.

In June 2016 Dudoit moved to Belgium, signing a two-year deal with First Division B side Tubize. In his second season, Tubize finished bottom of the relegation playoffs, and Dudoit was one of a number of players to leave the club almost immediately, signing for divisional rivals Beerschot.

At the very end of the January 2020 transfer window, Dudoit returned to France with Dunkerque, signing a deal for the remainder of the season, with an option to extend for the following season.

In June 2022, Dudoit moved to Versailles.

Career statistics

References

External links
 Emeric Dudouit at foot-national.com
 
 

1991 births
People from Coutances
Sportspeople from Manche
Footballers from Normandy
Living people
French footballers
Association football midfielders
Stade Malherbe Caen players
LB Châteauroux players
Les Herbiers VF players
A.F.C. Tubize players
K Beerschot VA players
USL Dunkerque players
FC Versailles 78 players
R.E. Virton players
Ligue 2 players
Championnat National players
Challenger Pro League players
Championnat National 3 players
French expatriate footballers
Expatriate footballers in Belgium
French expatriate sportspeople in Belgium